Jackie Doran is an Australian television and radio presenter.

She is mostly known for her role in The Naughty Rude Show which aired on Channel 31, WTV and C31 Adelaide in 2009, for which she won an Antenna Award for Most Outstanding Female Presenter.
Jackie is one of the four members in The Boardroom podcast. 
She currently lives in Melbourne, Australia.

References 

Living people
Australian television presenters
Australian women television presenters
Year of birth missing (living people)